Jan Remco Theodoor Campert (Spijkenisse, 15 August 1902 – 12 January 1943) was a Dutch journalist, theater critic and writer who lived in Amsterdam. During the German occupation of the Netherlands in World War II Campert was arrested for aiding Jews. He was held in the Neuengamme concentration camp, where he died.

Campert is best known for his poem "" ("The Song of the Eighteen Dead"), describing the execution of 18 resistance workers (15 resistance fighters and three communists) by the German occupier. Written in 1941 and based on an account published in Het Parool, the poem was clandestinely published in 1943 as a poetry card (rijmprent) by what became the De Bezige Bij publishing house to raise money to hide Jewish children.

He was the father of the novelist and poet Remco Campert.

The Jan Campert Prize is named after him.

References

Further reading 
 Hans Renders, Wie weet slaag ik in de dood. Biografie van Jan Campert. De Bezige Bij, Amsterdam 2004.

1902 births
1943 deaths
Dutch male poets
People from Spijkenisse
People who died in Neuengamme concentration camp
Dutch civilians killed in World War II
20th-century Dutch poets
20th-century Dutch male writers